Cheney Brannon (born April 29, 1973) is an American musician. He is a former drummer for the rock band Collective Soul, and is the current drummer for acts such as Cheap Thrill, Riley Biederer, John Corabi and Joel Kosche.

Life and career

Early life and career beginnings
Brannon is a self-taught drum player, beginning at age 9. At age 11 he joined his first band, Chapter One. At age 18, Brannon moved to Atlanta to engage with the music scene.

Collective Soul
Brannon is credited in the liner notes of the Collective Soul album Afterwords (2007) as having played the tambourine on the track "What I Can Give You."

In October 2008, Brannon became an official member of the band, replacing then-drummer Ryan Hoyle.

During Brannon's tenure as drummer, Collective Soul performed the 2009 NFC Championship Game halftime show; recorded and released the album Collective Soul (2009), also known as Rabbit to differentiate it from the band's 1995 album of the same name; performed the song "You" on the March 16, 2010, episode of The Tonight Show with Jay Leno; re-recorded and released the single "Tremble for My Beloved" in 2010; and toured nationally and internationally from 2008 to 2011. In September 2009, Collective Soul were inducted into the Georgia Music Hall of Fame.

In January 2012, Brannon left the band to pursue other music opportunities.

Discography

Studio albums

With Collective Soul

Singles

With Collective Soul

Other appearances

See also
List of drummers

References

External links
 
 

1973 births
Alternative rock drummers
American alternative rock musicians
American male drummers
American rock drummers
Collective Soul members
Living people
Musicians from Atlanta
Musicians from Nashville, Tennessee
20th-century American drummers
21st-century American drummers